Ups and Downs or The Ups and Downs may refer to:

Music 
 "Ups & Downs", a 2005 song by Snoop Dogg
 "Ups & Downs", a song by 213 from The Hard Way
 Ups and Downs (band), Australian band
 The Ups and Downs (album), a 1985 album by Stephen Duffy (as Stephen "Tin Tin" Duffy)
 Ups & Downs: Early Recordings and B-Sides, a compilation album by Saves the Day
 "Ups and Downs", a 1967 song by Paul Revere & the Raiders

Film and television 
 The Ups and Downs (1914 film), a 1914 short film starring Wallace Beery and Charles J. Stine
 Ups and Downs (1915 film), a 1915 film featuring Oliver Hardy
 Ups and Downs (1937 film), a 1937 short musical
 Ups and Downs (2000 TV series), a Hong Kong program featuring Patricia Liu
 The Ups and Downs of a Handyman, a 1975 British comedy film

Other 
 The 69th Regiment of Foot, nicknamed the Ups and Downs

See also

 Up and Down (disambiguation)